This is an index of lists of slogans


Business
List of Coca-Cola slogans
List of GMA Network slogans
List of Harvey's slogans
List of McDonald's ad programs
List of MTV slogans
List of US Airways slogans
List of Walmart Canada slogans
List of Zellers slogans

Politics
List of political slogans
List of U.S. presidential campaign slogans
List of slogans of the opposition to the U.S. involvement in the Vietnam War
List of North Korean propaganda slogans

Social
LGBT slogans
Slogans and terms derived from the September 11 attacks
List of labor slogans

Other
Slogans of the United States Army

!
Lists\